José Francisco Coronato Rodríguez (born 4 December 1953) is a Mexican politician and lawyer affiliated with the Citizens' Movement. He currently serves as Deputy of the LXII Legislature of the Mexican Congress representing Morelos.

References

1953 births
Living people
People from Cuernavaca
Citizens' Movement (Mexico) politicians
21st-century Mexican politicians
20th-century Mexican lawyers
Politicians from Morelos
National Autonomous University of Mexico alumni
Academic staff of Universidad Tecnológica de México
Mexican prosecutors
Deputies of the LXII Legislature of Mexico
Members of the Chamber of Deputies (Mexico) for Morelos